Asteguieta or Astegieta (in Basque Aztegieta) is a village in the municipality of Vitoria-Gasteiz, in Álava, Basque Country, Spain. 

Populated places in Álava